Anatoma fujikurai is a species of minute sea snail, a marine gastropod mollusk or micromollusk in the family Anatomidae. It was found at a hydrothermal vent field in Myōjin Knoll caldera, Izu-Ogasawara Arc, Japan.

See also
 Parakaryon myojinensis, a highly unusual single-celled organism discovered at the same location

References

External links

 To Encyclopedia of Life
 To World Register of Marine Species

Anatomidae
Gastropods described in 2010